Bernardo Neves Jesus Gouveia Silva (born 31 May 2001) is a Portuguese footballer who plays as a midfielder for Real on loan from Famalicão.

Career
He made his professional debut for Dordrecht on 27 February 2021 in the Eerste Divisie.

On 16 September 2021, he returned to Portugal and signed with Famalicão.

References

External links

2001 births
People from Viseu
Sportspeople from Viseu District
Living people
Portuguese footballers
Portugal youth international footballers
Association football midfielders
S.L. Benfica B players
FC Dordrecht players
F.C. Famalicão players
Real S.C. players
Eerste Divisie players
Primeira Liga players
Portuguese expatriate footballers
Expatriate footballers in the Netherlands
Portuguese expatriate sportspeople in the Netherlands